Nargis Dutt (born Fatima Rashid; 1 June 1929 – 3 May 1981) was an Indian actress and politician who worked in Hindi cinema. Regarded as one of the greatest actresses in the history of Indian cinema, she made her screen debut in a minor role at the age of five with Talash-E-Haq (1935), but her acting career actually began with the film Tamanna (1942).

In a career spanning three decades, Nargis had her first leading role with Taqdeer (1943). Nargis had her breakthrough with the romance film Andaz (1949) and the musical Barsaat (1949). Following this she starred in Raj Kapoor's crime drama Awaara (1951), which was a major critical and financial success. After a brief setback in the early 1950s, she reemerged with the comedy-drama Shree 420 (1955) and the romantic comedy Chori Chori (1956). Nargis starred in Mehboob Khan's Oscar-nominated epic drama Mother India (1957), the highest-grossing film in India at that point of time, for which she won Filmfare Award for Best Actress. She would appear infrequently in films during the 1960s. Some of her films of this period include the drama Raat Aur Din (1967), for which she received the inaugural National Film Award for Best Actress.

Nargis married her Mother India co-star Sunil Dutt in 1958. Together they had three children, including the actor Sanjay Dutt. Along with her husband, Nargis formed the Ajanta Arts Culture Troupe which hired several leading actors and singers of the time and held stage shows at border areas. In the early 1970s, Nargis became the first patron of The Spastic Society of India and her subsequent work with the organisation brought her recognition as a social worker and later a Rajya Sabha nomination in 1980.

Nargis died in 1981 of pancreatic cancer, only three days before her son Sanjay Dutt made his debut in Hindi films with the film Rocky. In 1982, the Nargis Dutt Memorial Cancer Foundation was established in her memory. The award for Best Feature Film on National Integration in the Annual Film Awards ceremony is called the Nargis Dutt Award in her honour.

Early life
Nargis was born on 1 June 1929 as Fatima Rashid in Calcutta, Bengal Presidency, British India (now Kolkata, West Bengal, India) into a Punjabi Muslim family. Her father Abdul Rashid, formerly Mohanchand Uttamchand Tyagi ("Mohan Babu"), was originally a wealthy Punjabi Hindu heir of the Mohyal Brahmin caste from Rawalpindi who had converted to Islam. Her mother was Jaddanbai Hussain, from Benares City, Benares State, who was born into a Muslim family of Hindu Brahmin origin which had converted to Islam; and was a Hindustani classical music singer and one of the early pioneers of Indian cinema. Nargis' family then moved from Punjab to Allahabad, United Provinces of Agra and Oudh, before settling in Calcutta, Bengal Presidency. She introduced Nargis into the movie culture unfolding in India at the time. Nargis' maternal half-brother, Anwar Hussain, was also a film actor.

Career
Fatima made her first film appearance in the 1935 film Talashe Haq when she was six years old, credited as Baby Nargis. Nargis is a Persian word meaning Narcissus, the daffodil flower. She was subsequently credited as Nargis in all of her films.

Nargis appeared in numerous films after her debut. In 1943 at the age of 14, she appeared in Mehboob Khan's Taqdeer, opposite Motilal. The film was a box office success, and she was extensively praised for her performance. Filmindia referred to it as "an excellent debut".

Following Taqdeer, Nargis starred in the 1945 period drama Humayun, opposite the leading actor of those times, Ashok Kumar. The film was moderately successful. Among her early releases were Mela, Anokha Pyar and Aag all in 1948. The former two starred her with Dilip Kumar and the latter marked her first collaboration with Raj Kapoor. Except Mela, which was among the highest-grossing films of that year, none of her film fared well in 1948.

In 1949, Nargis starred in Mehboob Khan's critically acclaimed drama Andaz. The film saw her playing Neena, whose husband Rajan (Raj Kapoor) suspects of her having an affair with her friend Dilip (Dilip Kumar). It had a slow start at the box office, but as soon as positive word-of-mouth spread, it emerged as a major commercial success and the highest-grossing film of all time. The film was first hit in Kapoor's career, and a breakthrough for Nargis and Kumar. After the success of the movie, Kapoor cast her again as a leading lady in his second directorial venture after the unsuccessful Aag (1948).

Barsaat, directed by Kapoor starred Nargis as a village belle and Kapoor as a poet. The film was the debut of Nimmi, who would later become a well-known actress. Its release was already hyped due to the huge success of Andaz, and therefore it became another major box office success. Barsaat was the highest-grossing film of 1949, as well as of all time, breaking the record of Andaz.

Next, Nargis played the lead roles in 1950 films Jogan and Babul, along with Dilip Kumar. Both of them were box-office hits and her performance in Babul was specially noticed.

Due to the success of Andaz and Barsaat, Raj Kapoor was impressed by Nargis' onscreen charm and presence. He therefore chose her to play a character in Awaara (1951) (often written as Awāra). Although it revolved around a father and his estranged son, Nargis played the pivotal role of a lawyer who knows the truth that Raj (played by Kapoor) and Raghunath (played by Prithviraj Kapoor) are son-father. Unlike the roles played by other actresses of those times, Nargis portrayed an outspoken woman-lawyer who criticises the people who regard woman as a "thing made for household chores". She was also seen donning a swimwear in a scene from Awaara, a bold outfit for an Indian woman to wear in that era. The film was released on 14 December 1951, receiving universal acclaim for the performances of Prithviraj, Raj and Nargis. Not only in India, the film was a blockbuster overseas too, making Nargis and Raj well-known stars in countries such as Greece and the United States. Grossing 12.5 million in India, it became the highest-grossing film of all time, breaking the record of Barsaat. Deedar, released in the same year was another hit in Nargis' filmography.

She was paired opposite Trilok Kapoor, uncle of Raj Kapoor, in Pyar Ki Baatein directed by her elder brother Akhtar Hussain.

Nargis' films released between 1952 and 1954 did not perform well, neither critically and commercially. In 1952, she had as many as six releases, only Anhonee being a success. 1953 and 1954 saw her doing five films, none of them a box-office hit. However, her 1953 film Aah has gained a cult status over the years. Nargis revived her career with Raj Kapoor's social drama Shree 420 (1955) which became the highest-grosser at the time. 

Nargis and Raj Kapoor acted together in 16 films spanning over a period of 10 years, including Awaara, Shree 420, Jagte Raho (cameo), Andaz, Chori Chori, Aah, Aag and Barsaat. Their first film together was Aag in 1948. Aag was not a commercial success, Aah earnings were average, but others were commercially successful. Songs from these movies featuring them have grown to become memorable. Some examples are "Barsaat Mein Humse Mile" and "Jiya Beqarar Hai" (in Barsaat); "Dam Bhar Jo Udhar Munh Phere" and "Ghar Aaya Mera Pardesi" (in Awaara); "Sham Gayi Raat Aayi", "Ichak Dana Beechak Dana" and "Pyaar Hua Ikraar Hua" (in Shree 420); and "Pancchi Banoon Udti Phiroon", "Aa Ja Sanam Madhur Chandni Mein", and "Yeh Raat Bheegi Bheegi" (in Chori Chori). Their work in Awaara made the couple famous internationally, particularly in the Soviet Union, where the film was dubbed in Russian and released as Brodiaga.

She once again collaborated with Kapoor for the box office success Chori Chori (1956), which revolves around a girl (Nargis) who runs away from her house in order to marry a gold digger pilot (Pran), but ends up falling for a news reporter (Kapoor) whom she meets in a bus. In the same year, she did a special appearance in Kapoor's Jagte Raho. The film was her last to co-star Raj Kapoor.

In 1957, she appeared in Mehboob Khan's Oscar-nominated epic drama Mother India, which won her the Filmfare Award for Best Actress. Baburao Patel of the film magazine, Filmindia, in December 1957, described Mother India as "the greatest picture produced in India" and wrote that no other actress would have been able to perform the role as well as Nargis. Also in 1957, she acted in the Pardesi (marketed as Journey Beyond Three Seas in English), which was an Indo-Soviet co-production. After her marriage to Sunil Dutt in 1958, Nargis gave up her film career to settle down with her family, after her last few films were released.

She made her last film appearance in the psychological drama Raat Aur Din (1967), being convinced to act after 15 years. The film was well received and Nargis' performance as a woman who has dissociative identity disorder was critically acclaimed. For her performance in the film, she received a nomination for the Filmfare Award for Best Actress, and won the inaugural National Film Award for Best Actress.

She was also nominated to the Rajya Sabha (upper house of Indian Parliament) from 1980 to 1981, but due to cancer she fell ill and died during her tenure.

Personal life

Nargis had a long-time relationship with actor Raj Kapoor, who was her co-star in the films Awaara and Shree 420. Raj Kapoor was married and had children. After he refused to divorce his wife, Nargis ended their nine-year-long relationship.

Nargis married actor Sunil Dutt; who was a Hindu, also of Punjabi Mohyal descent, on 11 March 1958. Reportedly, Dutt had saved her life from a fire on the sets of Mother India. She had also reportedly helped Dutt's sister and mother. She converted to Hinduism on her marriage. They had three children: Sanjay Dutt, Namrata Dutt, and Priya Dutt.

Sanjay went on to become a successful film actor. Namrata married actor Kumar Gaurav, son of veteran actor Rajendra Kumar who had appeared alongside Nargis and Sunil Dutt in Mother India. Priya became a politician and a Member of Parliament (Lok Sabha).

With her husband, Nargis formed the Ajanta Arts Cultural Troupe, which involved several leading actors and singers of the time, and performed at remote frontiers to entertain the Indian soldiers at border. It was the first troupe to perform in Dhaka, after the liberation war of Bangladesh in 1971. Later, Nargis worked for the cause of spastic children. She became the first patron of the Spastics Society of India. Her charitable work for the organisation got her recognition as a social worker.

Nargis loved wearing white saris, speaking over the telephone and eating panipuris sold on the streets. She was an excellent swimmer and enjoyed playing cricket with her brothers. The founder of the Spastic Society of India, Mithu Alur, stated in an interview that Nargis had a dream of pursuing medicine that she could never fulfill.

Illness and death
On 2 August 1980, Nargis fell ill during a session of the Rajya Sabha, with the initial cause assumed to be jaundice. She was rushed home and admitted to Breach Candy Hospital in Bombay. After 15 days of tests, during which her condition kept worsening and she rapidly lost weight, she was diagnosed with pancreatic cancer in 1980 and underwent treatment for the disease at Memorial Sloan-Kettering Cancer Center in New York City.

Upon her return to India, her condition deteriorated and she was admitted at Breach Candy Hospital. Nargis went into a coma on 2 May 1981 after she became seriously ill and died the next day, aged 51. She was buried at Bada Qabrastan Mumbai. On 7 May 1981, at the premiere of her son's debut film Rocky, one seat was kept vacant for her.

One year after her death, the Nargis Dutt Memorial Cancer Foundation was established by Sunil Dutt in her memory. Although Nargis' death is attributed to pancreatic cancer, her daughter, Namrata Dutt Kumar, claimed her mother had successfully fought the cancer but died from a urinary tract infection. Nargis's son, Sanjay Dutt, added that her lowered immunity levels made her susceptible to the infection.

Legacy
In 2011, Rediff.com listed her as the greatest actress of all time, stating, "An actress with range, style, grace and an incredibly warm screen presence, Nargis is truly a leading lady to celebrate." M.L. Dhawan from The Tribune said, "In almost all her films Nargis created a woman who could be desired and deified. The charisma of Nargis's screen image lay in that it oscillated between the simple and the chic with equal ease."

In 2005, Indiatimes Movies wrote: "Whenever Raj Kapoor and Nargis came together on screen, sparks flew. Their chemistry was electrifying and it crackles with raw passion in Raj Kapoor's Awaara. Nargis's wild and carefree sensuality pulsates and Raj Kapoor's scruffy hair-rebellious persona only adds fuel to the fire". Surendra Kumar of The Sunday Guardian stated, "She was a versatile actor who could carry off serious roles, light roles and even comic roles with the same élan. She could be urbane and sophisticated, as in Awaara, Chori Chori and Andaz; simple and ordinary, as in Sri 420; and every inch a traditional village woman, as in Mother India."

A scene from the 1949 film Barsaat, featuring Raj Kapoor holding Nargis in one arm and a violin in the other, was chosen as the basis for the logo of R. K. Films. Multiple books were written about Nargis. The first was written in 1994 by T. J. S. George and was titled The Life and Times of Nargis. In 2007, Nargis' daughters Priya and Namrata published a book about the lives of their parents, titled, Mr. and Mrs. Dutt: Memories of our Parents. Also that year, Darlingji: The True Love Story of Nargis and Sunil Dutt was released by Kishwar Desai.

In 2000, she was honoured with "Best Actress of the Millennium" by Hero Honda and film magazine Stardust. In 2011, Rediff.com named her "the greatest Indian actress of all time" and was listed in the 25 greatest Asian actors in history" by CNN in 2010. Nargis was played by actress Manisha Koirala in the 2018 film Sanju, the biopic of her son, Sanjay Dutt. The film is ranked as one of the highest grossing Indian films of 2018. Feryna Wazheir portrayed her in the 2018 film Manto.

Awards and recognitions
 1958 – Filmfare Award for Best Actress for Mother India
 1958 – She was the first film actress to conferred by the Government of India with the Padma Shri title, the fourth highest civilian award.
1958 – Best Actress Award at the Karlovy Vary International Film Festival  for Mother India
 1968 – National Film Award for Best Actress for Raat Aur Din.
 1969 – Nominated, Filmfare Award for Best Actress for Raat Aur Din
 2001 – "Best Artists of the Millennium" award by Hero Honda and film magazine Stardust along with actor Amitabh Bachchan.

A street in Bandra, Mumbai, is named Nargis Dutt Road in her memory. A postal stamp of face value 100 paise was issued by India Post was issued in Nargis' honour on 30 December 1993. Google celebrated Nargis Dutt on her 86th birthday on 1 June 2015.

The National Film Awards honoured Dutt by instituting the Nargis Dutt Award for Best Feature Film on National Integration upon her achievement in Hindi Cinema.

Filmography

References

External links

 
 
  – 1991 documentary directed by Priya Dutt and produced by Films Division of India

Further reading
 
 
 
 

1929 births
1981 deaths
Actresses from Allahabad
Actresses from Kolkata
Deaths from pancreatic cancer
Indian film actresses
Recipients of the Padma Shri in arts
Nominated members of the Rajya Sabha
Converts to Hinduism from Islam
Deaths from cancer in India
Indian former Muslims
Indian Hindus
Actresses in Hindi cinema
Actresses in Urdu cinema
20th-century Indian actresses
Best Actress National Film Award winners
Politicians from Kolkata
20th-century Indian women politicians
20th-century Indian politicians
Indian actor-politicians
Women in West Bengal politics
Politicians from Allahabad
Punjabi people
Punjabi Hindus
Filmfare Awards winners
Women members of the Rajya Sabha